Big Fun is a 2009 studio album by Towa Tei. It peaked at number 25 on the Oricon Albums Chart.

Track listing

Charts

References

External links
 

2009 albums
Towa Tei albums
Nippon Columbia albums